Mirke is a small settlement immediately south of Vrhnika in the Inner Carniola region of Slovenia.

References

External links
Mirke on Geopedia

Populated places in the Municipality of Vrhnika